Volkan Ayvazoğlu (born 28 June 1993), better known by his stage name Ceg, is a Turkish rapper and songwriter.

Discography

Studio albums
 TepeBaşı Cehennemi (2007)
 Disstributör EP (2007)
 Poligon Mixtape (of Sfenx MassaCrew) (2007)
 Optimus Prime (2008)
 Ağır Siklet Rap (2009)
 Mixtape Vol 1 (of BK26) (2010)
 Müzikte Devrim (2012)
 Alter Ego (2014)
 Delüzyon (2016)
 Trapanasyon (2018)
 DMT (2020)

Singles and EPs
Alles Gefickt (ft. AbdeZz)  
J&b (ft. Bambıl B) 
Doğduğumdan Beri
Sahnelerde Büyüdüm
Sevilmeyen Adam(2014)
Son 2 Yıl(2015)
Volkan Ayvazoğlu(2015)
Bu Gece (2018)
 Bu Gece (Furkan Karakılıç Remix) (2020)
 Zorla (2019) (ft. Taki)
 Şampanya (2019)
 Sokaklar (2019)
 Son Gaz (ft. Ati242)
 Yeşillendir (ft. Anıl Piyancı)
 Bu Gece Bizim (ft. Tankurt Manas & Grogi)
 First Class (2020)
 Gerçekleşebilir (2021)
 Gökyüzü Limit'' (2022)

References

Turkish rappers
Musicians from Istanbul
Living people
1993 births
Turkish lyricists
21st-century Turkish male singers
21st-century Turkish singers
Turkish singer-songwriters